Guy Nicholson Turnbow (March 28, 1908 – October 4, 1975) was an American football tackle who played two seasons with the Philadelphia Eagles of the National Football League. He played college football at the University of Mississippi and attended Brookhaven High School in Brookhaven, Mississippi.

Professional career

Philadelphia Eagles
Turnbow played in eleven games, starting seven, for the Philadelphia Eagles from 1933 to 1934.

References

External links
Just Sports Stats

1908 births
1975 deaths
Players of American football from Mississippi
American football tackles
Ole Miss Rebels football players
Philadelphia Eagles players
People from Brookhaven, Mississippi